ImeIme Umana (born 1993) served as a Nigerian-American law clerk for Robert L. Wilkins. She is the 131st president—and the first black female president—of the Harvard Law Review.

Early years 
Umana was born in State College to Nigerian immigrant parents originally from Akwa Ibom State in Nigeria.

Education 
She had her high school education at Susquehanna Township High School in Harrisburg. She then went to Harvard College in 2014, where she acquired a BA in Joint Concentration in African American Studies and Government. She holds a degree in law from Harvard and a Master of Public Policy from the Harvard Kennedy School of Government.

Career 
While obtaining her bachelor's degree, she served as president of Harvard's Institute of Politics and worked at the university's Hiphop Archive. She interned at the Public Defender Service for the District of Columbia, served as both the Community Action Chair of the Harvard University Institute of Politics and Professional Developmental Chair for Public Interest for the Harvard Black Law Students Association.

On 29 January 2017, she was appointed president of the Harvard Law Review by the review's 92 student editors. She contested against 12 candidates, eight of whom were women and eight of whom were people of colour. All candidates were made to answer questions from a forum of editors, write responses to submitted questions and participate in mock editorial activities.

She served as a law clerk for Robert L. Wilkins of the United States Court of Appeals for the District of Columbia Circuit. She was a law clerk for justice Sonia Sotomayor of the Supreme Court of the United States during the Court's 2019 term.

Awards 

 2017 - African Diaspora Awards
2017 - Most Influential People of African Descent Award
2019 - Soros Justice Fellows

See also 
 List of law clerks of the Supreme Court of the United States (Seat 3)

References

Living people
1993 births
Harvard Law School alumni
African-American women
Harvard College alumni
Harvard Kennedy School alumni
People from Harrisburg, Pennsylvania
Law clerks of the Supreme Court of the United States